Girolamo Boncompagni (1622–1684) was a Roman Catholic cardinal.

Biography
Girolamo was the Grand-nephew of Cardinal Filippo Boncompagni (1572). Nephew of Cardinal Francesco Boncompagni (1621) and uncle of another Cardinal Girolamo Boncompagni, archbishop of Bologna (1695).

On 4 February 1652, he was consecrated bishop by Niccolò Albergati-Ludovisi, Cardinal-Priest of Santa Maria degli Angeli e dei Martiri, with Ranuccio Scotti Douglas, Bishop Emeritus of Borgo San Donnino, and Carlo Carafa della Spina, Bishop of Aversa, serving as co-consecrators.

Episcopal succession
While bishop, he was the principal consecrator of:
Giulio Spinola, Titular Archbishop of Laodicea in Phrygia (1658);
Niccolo Pietro Bargellini, Titular Archbishop of Thebae (1665);
Girolamo Gastaldi, Archbishop of Benevento (1680);
and the principal co-consecrator of:
Ascanio Ugolini, Bishop of Muro Lucano (1652).

References

1622 births
1684 deaths
17th-century Italian Roman Catholic archbishops
17th-century Italian cardinals
Boncompagni